Cortland is a cultivar of apple developed at the New York State Agricultural Experiment Station in Geneva, New York, United States in 1898. The apple was named after nearby Cortland County, New York. It is among the fifteen most popular in the United States and Canada.

Breeding
After the many attributes of McIntosh were discovered, plant breeders began crossing it with other varieties to enhance its traits. One of the earliest was the 'Cortland'. Its flavor is sweet compared to McIntosh, and it has a flush of crimson against a pale yellow or green background sprinkled with short, dark red stripes and gray-green dots. It has white flesh and is resistant to browning.

It was first bred by American horticulturalist S.A Beach.

Patented mutants (sports)
The original Cortland variety, introduced in 1915 by the New York State Agricultural Experiment Station, produced apples which were 20–30% red, and was not patented.  Since then, several sports have been identified and patented:

Descendant cultivars
 Birgit Bonnier

Footnotes

Cortland
American apples